Selevko is a surname. Notable people with the surname include:

 Aleksandr Selevko (born 2001), Estonian figure skater
 Mihhail Selevko (born 2002), Estonian figure skater

Ukrainian-language surnames